Trutnevo is a rural locality (a village) in Kiprevskoye Rural Settlement, Kirzhachsky District, Vladimir Oblast, Russia. The population was 3 as of 2010. There is 1 street.

Geography 
Trutnevo is located on the Bolshoy Kirzhach River, 18 km northeast of Kirzhach (the district's administrative centre) by road. Smolnevo is the nearest rural locality.

References 

Rural localities in Kirzhachsky District